James Lee Geddes (born March 23, 1949) is an American former professional baseball pitcher who appeared in 11 career games for the Chicago White Sox of Major League Baseball in  and  . Born in Columbus, Ohio, he graduated from Ohio State University, where he played baseball and basketball.

The ChiSox selected Geddes in the sixth round of the 1970 Major League Baseball Draft and he debuted in 1971 with the Double-A Asheville Tourists, where he appeared in 28 games, evenly divided between starting and relief assignments, split 12 decisions, and posted a 3.65 earned run average with four complete games, a shutout, and three saves. 

He made the 1972 White Sox' early season roster, and worked in five games sprinkled throughout the season, with one start, and compiled a poor 6.97 earned run average in 10 innings pitched. He also spent part of the year back in Double-A. He also split 1973 between the White Sox and the minor leagues, although he had considerably more success in the big leagues than he had in 1972. In six appearances and 15 innings pitched, he lowered his ERA to 2.87. As in 1972, he made one start, and did not earn a decision or a save.

Geddes returned to the minors in 1973 for the rest of his five-year pro career. His MLB tenure was hampered by poor control, as he issued 24 bases on balls in 26 innings pitched. He struck out ten and permitted 14 hits.

External links

1949 births
Living people
Appleton Foxes players
Asheville Tourists players
Baseball players from Columbus, Ohio
Basketball players from Columbus, Ohio
Chicago White Sox players
Knoxville Sox players
Iowa Oaks players
Major League Baseball pitchers
Ohio State Buckeyes baseball players
Ohio State Buckeyes men's basketball players
Shreveport Captains players